Alamana is an unincorporated community located in central Volusia County, Florida, United States, east of Deltona just north of Lake Ashby off SR 415. The community was established in 1910 and named for a settler, J.A. Alaman.

In 1915, the community had a post office and a general store.

References

Unincorporated communities in Volusia County, Florida
Populated places established in 1910
Unincorporated communities in Florida